Eduardo Hughes Galeano (3 September 1940 – 13 April 2015) was a Uruguayan journalist, writer and novelist considered, among other things, "global soccer's pre-eminent man of letters" and "a literary giant of the Latin American left".

Galeano's best-known works are Las venas abiertas de América Latina (Open Veins of Latin America, 1971) and Memoria del fuego (Memory of Fire Trilogy, 19826). "I'm a writer," the author once said of himself, "obsessed with remembering, with remembering the past of America and above all that of Latin America, intimate land condemned to amnesia."

Author Isabel Allende, who said her copy of Galeano's book was one of the few items with which she fled Chile in 1973 after the military coup of Augusto Pinochet, called Open Veins of Latin America "a mixture of meticulous detail, political conviction, poetic flair, and good storytelling."

Life
Eduardo Germán María Hughes Galeano was born in Montevideo, Uruguay, on 3 September 1940. His two family names were inherited from Welsh and Italian (from Genoa) great-grandfathers; the other two were from Germany and Spain. Galeano wrote under his maternal family name; as a young man, he briefly wrote for a Uruguayan socialist publication, El Sol, signing articles as "Gius," "a pseudonym approximating the pronunciation in Spanish of his paternal surname Hughes."  Galeano's family belonged to the fallen Uruguayan aristocracy. 

After completing two years of secondary school, Galeano went to work at age fourteen  in various jobs, including messenger and fare collector. He eventually landed at El Sol. The Uruguayan socialist weekly first published the teenager's comics prior to his writing.  Galeano's passion for drawing continued throughout his life; his vignettes can be seen in many of his later books while his signature was often accompanied by a small hand-drawn pig. As a journalist throughout the 1960s Galeano rose in prominence among leftist publications, and became editor of Marcha, an influential weekly with contributors such as Mario Vargas Llosa, Mario Benedetti, Manuel Maldonado Denis and Roberto Fernández Retamar. For two years he edited the daily Época and worked as editor-in-chief of the University Press. In 1959 he married his first wife, Silvia Brando, and in 1962, having divorced, he remarried to Graciela Berro.

In 1973, a military coup took power in Uruguay; Galeano was imprisoned and later was forced to flee, going into exile in Argentina where he founded the magazine Crisis.  His 1971 book Open Veins of Latin America was banned by the right-wing military government, not only in Uruguay, but also in Chile and Argentina. In 1976 he married for the third time to Helena Villagra; however, in the same year, the Videla regime took power in Argentina in a bloody military coup and his name was added to the list of those condemned by the death squads. He fled again, this time to Spain, where he wrote his famous trilogy, Memoria del fuego (Memory of Fire), described as "the most powerful literary indictment of colonialism in the Americas."

At the beginning of 1985 Galeano returned to Montevideo when democratization occurred. Following the victory of Tabaré Vázquez and the Broad Front alliance in the 2004 Uruguayan elections marking the first left-wing government in Uruguayan history Galeano wrote a piece for The Progressive titled "Where the People Voted Against Fear" in which Galeano showed support for the new government and concluded that the Uruguayan populace used "common sense" and were "tired of being cheated" by the traditional Colorado and Blanco parties. Following the creation of TeleSUR, a Latin American television station based in Caracas, Venezuela, in 2005 Galeano along with other left-wing intellectuals such as Tariq Ali and Adolfo Pérez Esquivel joined the network's 36 member advisory committee.

On February 10, 2007, Galeano underwent a successful operation to treat lung cancer. During an interview with journalist Amy Goodman following Barack Obama's election as President of the United States in November 2008, Galeano said: "The White House will be Barack Obama's house in the time coming, but this White House was built by black slaves. And I'd like, I hope, that he never, never forgets this." At the 17 April 2009 opening session of the 5th Summit of the Americas held in Port of Spain, Trinidad and Tobago, Venezuelan President Hugo Chávez gave a Spanish-language copy of Galeano's Open Veins of Latin America to U.S. President Barack Obama, who was making his first diplomatic visit to the region.

In a May 2009 interview he spoke about his past and recent works, some of which deal with the relationships between freedom and slavery, and democracies and dictatorships: "not only the United States, also some European countries, have spread military dictatorships all over the world. And they feel as if they are able to teach democracy". He also talked about how and why he has changed his writing style, and his recent rise in popularity.

In April 2014 Galeano gave an interview at the II Bienal Brasil do Livro e da Leitura in which he regretted some aspects of the writing style in Las Venas Abiertas de América Latina, saying "Time has passed, I've begun to try other things, to bring myself closer to human reality in general and to political economy specifically. 'The Open Veins' tried to be a political economy book, but I simply didn't have the necessary education. I do not regret writing it, but it is a stage that I have since passed." This interview was picked up by many critics of Galeano's work in which they used the statement to reinforce their own criticisms. However, in an interview with Jorge Majfud he said, "The book, written ages ago, is still alive and kicking.  I am simply honest enough to admit that at this point in my life the old writing style seems rather stodgy, and that it's hard for me to recognize myself in it since I now prefer to be increasingly brief and untrammeled. [The] voices that have been raised against me and against The Open Veins of Latin America are seriously ill with bad faith."

Works

 
 

Las venas abiertas de América Latina (Open Veins of Latin America), a history of the region from the time of Columbus from the perspective of the subjugated people, is considered one of Galeano's best-known works. An English-language translation by Cedric Belfrage gained some popularity in the English-speaking world after Venezuelan President Hugo Chávez gave it as a gift to U.S. President Barack Obama in 2009.

Galeano was also an avid fan of football, writing most notably about it in Football in Sun and Shadow (El fútbol a sol y sombra). In a retrospective for SB Nation after Galeano's death, football writer Andi Thomas described the work—a history of the sport, as well as an outlet for the author's own experiences with the sport and his political polemics—as "one of the greatest books about football ever written".

Death
Galeano died on 13 April 2015 in Montevideo from lung cancer at the age of 74, survived by third wife Helena Villagra and three children.

Awards and honors

 2006: International Human Rights Award by Global Exchange
 2010: Stig Dagerman Prize
 2021: Posthumous "honoris causa" prize from the National University of Misiones.

See also
 Culture of Uruguay
 List of Uruguayan writers
 Z Communications

References

Bibliography

External links

Interview with Eduardo Galeano
Sandra Cisneros reads "Los Nadies/The Nobodies" by Eduardo Galeano from Book of Embraces, El libro de los abrazos (1989)  "".
"Writer Without Borders"—interview by Scott Widmer on In These Times
"Author of the Month," Escritores.org
"Chávez creates overnight bestseller with book gift to Obama", The Guardian, 19 April 2009 
Eduardo Galeano Interviewed by Jonah Raskin by Monthly Review, October 2009
Haiti Occupied Country

 "Eduardo Galeano, Chronicler of Latin America’s 'Open Veins,' on His New Book 'Children of the Days (interview), Democracy Now!, 8 May 2013

 
1940 births
2015 deaths
Anti-globalization writers
People from Montevideo
Uruguayan exiles
Uruguayan expatriates in Argentina
Uruguayan expatriates in Spain
Uruguayan journalists
Uruguayan novelists
Uruguayan people of Italian descent
Uruguayan people of Spanish descent
Uruguayan people of British descent
Uruguayan people of German descent
Uruguayan socialists
Writers on Latin America
Male novelists
Deaths from lung cancer in Uruguay
20th-century novelists
American Book Award winners
20th-century Uruguayan male writers
Recipients of the Delmira Agustini Medal
Premio Bartolomé Hidalgo